Tork Mahalleh-ye Alalan (also Romanized as Tork Maḩalleh-ye Ālālān; also known as Tork Maḩalleh) is a village in Asalem Rural District, Asalem District, Talesh County, Gilan Province, Iran. At the 2006 census, its population was 194, in 44 families.

References 

Populated places in Talesh County